The women's 100 metre breaststroke swimming competition at the 2002 Asian Games in Busan was held on 1 October at the Sajik Swimming Pool.

Schedule
All times are Korea Standard Time (UTC+09:00)

Records

Results 
Legend
DSQ — Disqualified

Heats

Final

References 

2002 Asian Games Report, Pages 218–219
Results

Swimming at the 2002 Asian Games